Samuel Faulkner McConnell (June 8, 1895 – June 27, 1981) was an American professional baseball player. He played in Major League Baseball for the Philadelphia Athletics during the 1915 season, primarily as a third baseman.

References

Major League Baseball third basemen
Philadelphia Athletics players
Richmond Virginians (minor league) players
Richmond Colts players
Baseball players from Pennsylvania
1895 births
1981 deaths
Nashville Vols players